NRK Folkemusikk is NRK's tenth radio channel, and was the first in Norway to be broadcast exclusively via DAB and Internet. The channel broadcasts music only, without presenters. The music consists of both new and old traditional Norwegian folk music in addition to some world music. The channel uses and includes recordings of folk music from the NRK archives, which contain over 50,000 recordings dating from 1934 until today, as well as other recordings. The channel started broadcasting as NRK Alltid Folkemusikk on 7 December 2004 but later simplified its name to the present NRK Folkemusikk.

External links 
Official website 
NRK Folkemusikk (Internet radio)

2004 establishments in Norway
NRK
Norwegian folk music
Radio stations established in 2004
Radio stations in Norway